Pterostichus acutipes is a species of woodland ground beetle in the family Carabidae. It is found in North America.

Subspecies
These two subspecies belong to the species Pterostichus acutipes:
 Pterostichus acutipes acutipes Barr, 1971
 Pterostichus acutipes kentuckensis Barr, 1971

References

Further reading

 

Pterostichus
Articles created by Qbugbot
Beetles described in 1971